Mount Olive High School is a historic former high school building located at Mount Olive, Wayne County, North Carolina.  It was built in 1925, and is a three-story, "T"-shaped, multicolored tapestry brick school building in the Classical Revival style. It features terra cotta and cast stone exterior details and arched doorways and windows. A two-room brick cafeteria addition was made in 1945–1946.  It housed Mount Olive Junior High from 1965 to 1979, after construction of the Southern Wayne High School.

It was probably the most important work by architect John David Gullett.

It was listed on the National Register of Historic Places in 1998 as "Mount Olive High School (Former)". It is also a contributing building in the Mount Olive Historic District, National Register-listed in 1999.

References

High schools in North Carolina
School buildings on the National Register of Historic Places in North Carolina
Neoclassical architecture in North Carolina
School buildings completed in 1925
Schools in Wayne County, North Carolina
National Register of Historic Places in Wayne County, North Carolina
Historic district contributing properties in North Carolina
1925 establishments in North Carolina